John Bradbury Bennet (December 6, 1865 – September 2, 1930) was an American army officer and brigadier general active during World War I.

Early life 
Bennet was born in New Brunswick, New Jersey. He graduated from the United States Military Academy number twenty-eight of sixty-five in the class of 1891.

Career 
Upon graduation, Bennet was commissioned in the Seventh Infantry which was stationed at Fort Lupton, Colorado.

During the Spanish–American War, Bennett was aide to General Henry Merriam, and during the Philippine insurrection, he commanded a company of the 16th Infantry. Later, he was assistant commandant and inspector of the Philippine Constabulary under General Henry T. Allen. He organized a school for the constabulary in Baguio.

In 1917, he was assistant chief of the Aviation Section of the Signal Corps, as a lieutenant colonel. He was in command of embarkation at Camp Merritt, New Jersey. In France he commanded the 11th Infantry. On October 1, 1918, Bennett became a brigadier general and commanded a casual officers' detachment and Base Section Number 4 at LeHarve.

After the war, Bennet operated the demobilization camp at Camp Meade, Maryland, then served on the War Department General Staff. He graduated in 1921 from the Army War College and in 1930 from the General Staff School at Fort Leavenworth, Kansas. In 1925, he retired as a colonel and was promoted to brigadier general on the retired list in 1930.

Awards 
Bennet was made an officer of the Legion of Honor from France.

Death and legacy
John Bradbury Bennet died at the age of sixty-four on September 2, 1930. and is buried in Arlington National Cemetery in Section: 7, Site: 9025

References

Bibliography 
Davis, Henry Blaine Jr. Generals in Khaki. Raleigh, NC: Pentland Press, 1998.

External links 
 Find A Grave

1865 births
1930 deaths
United States Army generals
United States Military Academy alumni
People from New Brunswick, New Jersey
United States Army generals of World War I
Burials at Arlington National Cemetery
Military personnel from New Jersey